Harold Leslie George Gibson  (15 July 1917 – 11 January 1994) was a British trade union leader.

Born in Liverpool, Gibson worked as a plumber until 1949, when he moved to Leicester to become the full-time northern district secretary for the National Union of Hosiery and Knitwear Workers (NUHKW).  In 1962, he was elected as general secretary of the union, then in 1975 to the top post of general president.

Gibson held a wide variety of posts in the broader trade union movement, including sitting on the management committee of the General Federation of Trade Unions and serving as its chair in 1974, serving on the Trades Union Congress' Textile Committee, the executive of the British Textile Confederation, and as president of the International Textile, Garment and Leather Workers' Federation.

Gibson retired in 1982, and was awarded an honorary degree by the University of Leicester.  He was made a Member of the Order of the British Empire in 1971, and an Officer in 1978.

References

1917 births
1994 deaths
General secretaries of British trade unions
Presidents of the General Federation of Trade Unions (UK)
Officers of the Order of the British Empire
Trade unionists from Liverpool